Allan Henry Loomes  (25 April 19171 November 1990) was an Australian public servant and diplomat.

Born at Burrinjuck, New South Wales, Loomes was the youngest of four children.

After service in the RAAF during World War II, Loomes moved to Canberra in 1946 to join the Commonwealth Public Service in the Department of External Affairs. His appointments included ambassadorial roles in Burma, Thailand, South Korea, Peru and Venezuela. In 1976 Loomes received non-resident accreditation for Colombia as Australia's first ambassador, presenting his credentials to President Alfonso López Michelsen.

Loomes was appointed an Officer of the Order of the British Empire in January 1962.

Loomes died on 1 November 1990. In 2010, a street in Casey, Australian Capital Territory was named Loomes Lane in Loomes' honour.

References

1917 births
1990 deaths
Ambassadors of Australia to Myanmar
Ambassadors of Australia to Peru
Ambassadors of Australia to South Korea
Ambassadors of Australia to Thailand
Ambassadors of Australia to Venezuela
University of Sydney alumni
Ambassadors of Australia to Colombia
Australian Officers of the Order of the British Empire